La Lucila del Mar is a town in the La Costa Partido of the Province of Buenos Aires, Argentina.

References 

Populated places in Buenos Aires Province
Populated coastal places in Argentina
Seaside resorts in Argentina